Way is an English surname. Notable people with the surname include:

Albert Way (1805–1874), English antiquary
Ann Way (1915–1993), English actress
Anthony Way (born 1982), English singer
Benjamin Way (1740–1808), English politician
Brian Way (1923–2006), English theatre teacher
Charles Way (born 1972), American football player
Damon Way (born 1971), American businessman
Daniel Way (born 1974), American comic book writer
Danny Way (born 1974), American skateboarder
Darren Way (born 1979), English footballer and manager
Soulja Boy (born DeAndre Way in 1990), American rapper and music producer
Edward Willis Way (1836–1898), Australian doctor
Erin Way (born 1987), American actress
Gerard Way (born 1977), American lead singer
Gregory Holman Bromley Way (1776–1844), English general
Isabel Steward Way (1882–1973), American writer
James Way (1853-1939), Australian minister
Kelly-Ann Way (born 1964), Canadian cyclist
Mikey Way (born 1980), American bassist
Pete Way (1951–2020), English musician
Richard Way (1914–1998), British civil servant
Samuel Way (1836–1916), Australian lawyer and judge
Tony Way (born 1978), Actor, comedian and writer
Tress Way (born 1990), American football punter 

English-language surnames